Tollemache (pronounced  ) and also spelled Tallemache or Talmash is an English surname which may refer to:

Algernon Tollemache (1805–1892), British politician
Bentley Lyonel John Tollemache, 3rd Baron Tollemache (1883–1955), British Army officer, and writer on croquet and bridge
Edward Tollemache (born 1976), British banker
Felix Tollemache (1796–1843), British politician
Frederick Tollemache (1804–1888), British politician
Henry James Tollemache (1846–1939), British politician
Hugh Tollemache (1802–1890), British priest
Sir Humphry Tollemache, 6th Baronet (1897–1990), Royal Marines general
John Manners Tollemache (c.1768–1837), British politician
John Tollemache, 1st Baron Tollemache (1805–1890), British politician and landowner
Leone Sextus Tollemache (1884–1917), British Army officer
Lionel Tollemache (disambiguation), several people
Louisa Tollemache, 7th Countess of Dysart (1745–1840) 
Sir Lyonel Tollemache, 4th Baronet (1854–1952), English landowner
Mortimer Tollemache (1872–1950), English cricketer
Ralph Tollemache (1826–1895), British clergyman
Thomas Tollemache (c.1651–1694), English soldier
Timothy Tollemache, 5th Baron Tollemache (born 1939), English farmer and landowner
Wilbraham Tollemache, 6th Earl of Dysart (1739–1821), British politician and art collector
Wilbraham Spencer Tollemache (1807–1890), English soldier
Wilbraham Tollemache, 2nd Baron Tollemache (1832–1904), British politician
William Tollemache, Lord Huntingtower (1766–1833), British politician
William Tollemache, Lord Huntingtower (1820–1872), British nobleman
William Tollemache, 9th Earl of Dysart (1859–1935), British landowner, Lord Lieutenant of Rutland

See also
Tollemache family
Baron Tollemache
Tollemache baronets

References

 
English-language surnames